The following is a list of divisions of the United States Army during the Vietnam War.

Active Duty Divisions and Brigades in Theater

AirMobile Divisions
  1st Cavalry Division
  101st Airborne Division

Infantry Divisions
  1st Infantry Division
  4th Infantry Division
 5th Infantry Division
  9th Infantry Division
  23rd Infantry Division
  25th Infantry Division

Independent Brigades
 1st Brigade, 5th Infantry Division
 3d Brigade, 82d Airborne Division
 11th Armored Cavalry Regiment
 11th Infantry Brigade
 173d Airborne Brigade
 196th Infantry Brigade
 198th Infantry Brigade
 199th Infantry Brigade
 18th Engineer Brigade (combat)
 20th Engineer Brigade
 223rd Aviation Brigade

Active Duty Divisions not in Theater

Armored Divisions
 1st Armored Division
 2d Armored Division
 3d Armored Division
 4th Armored Division

Infantry Divisions
 2d Infantry Division
 3d Infantry Division
 7th Infantry Division
 8th Infantry Division
 24th Infantry Division

National Guard Divisions

Armored Divisions
 30th Armored Division
 50th Armored Division

Infantry Divisions
 26th Infantry Division
 28th Infantry Division
 30th Infantry Division
 38th Infantry Division
 40th Infantry Division
 42d Infantry Division
 47th Infantry Division
 49th Infantry Division

Military units and formations of the United States Army in the Vietnam War
Vietnam War